Fort Defiance was an earthworks fortification on the western bank of the Elk River in northern Maryland. The fort was in use from 1813 to 1815 during the War of 1812 and repelled British forces on April 29, 1813.

References

See also
List of forts in Maryland

Forts in Maryland
Maryland in the War of 1812
War of 1812 forts